Counter-Intelligence: Shining a Light on Black Operations is a 2013 documentary that discusses how espionage agencies have influenced both governments and societies, domestically and abroad; it is a nonprofit documentary that was produced by Metanoia Films and directed by Scott Noble.

The documentary is divided into five parts with each section focusing on a different subject.  The five parts are: 1) The Company, 2) The Deep State, 3) The Strategy of Tension, 4)  Necrophilous, and 5) Drone Nation.

The Company 
One of the main topics discussed in this section of the documentary is plausible deniability, and how high officials are able to claim it by being kept out of the loop on certain topics.  Within a few years of its creation, the CIA become one of the most powerful institutions within the United States. After its creation the National Security Council passed a law that allowed the CIA to conduct programs that were officially nonexistent and therefore bypassed needing congressional approval. The National Security Council ordered these programs to be "planned and executed that any US Government responsibility for them is not evident to unauthorized persons and that if uncovered the US Government can plausibly disclaim any responsibility for them."  This gave the United States and the top leaders the ability to disavow that certain actions were done at the behest of the president himself. By doing this, there was no connection between the United States government and the acts that were to occur.

The Deep State 
The second section of the documentary focuses on the incarceration of people for profit and the expanding prison population of which the majority are incarcerated for drug related crimes. This section also looks at the "War on Drugs" and the criminal networks that have been involved in it for example mafias and gangs.  Colombia is mentioned when discussing "The War on Drugs" due to the drug trafficking that occurs in the state and the fighting that happens because of the trafficking. The documentary also mentions how the drug trafficking affects the people of Colombia.

The Strategy of Tension 
The third section of the documentary discusses the history of false flag operations that were used for propaganda, war, and psychological operations, also known as "psy-ops".  Two examples that are given in this portion of the documentary are Operation Northwoods and Operation Gladio.  These operations are used to show the clandestine nature of the planning and execution of operations.

Necrophilous 
The fourth portion of the documentary examines torture, war crimes, and the abuses of authority that occur during times of protest and war.  This section of the documentary discusses the bombings of Hiroshima and Nagasaki and the effects that those attacks had on the people.  The documentary also discusses other scenarios that the U.S. could have pursued when planning the bombings, and the possible outcomes of those scenarios are also discussed.  Ultimately the bombings of Hiroshima and Nagasaki were the final decisions on that matter.

Drone Nation 
The fifth and final portion of the documentary discusses the 2011 NDAA, the National Defense Authorization Act.  In 2011, the act was changed from only applying to "Enemy Combatants" to American citizens themselves. The Act allows for U.S. citizens in addition to enemy combatants to be arrested on American soil and to be detained for an indefinite amount of time. This section of the documentary looks at how the U.S. gets intelligence of "enemy combatants" and how drones are used.

References

American documentary films